Paulius Juodis (born August 24, 1978 in Klaipėda, Lithuanian SSR, USSR) is a Lithuanian basketball coach.  Since 2007 he was an assistant coach of „Neptūnas“ and became head coach in 2009–2010 season. On 11 May 2011, „Neptūnas“ renewed contract with him and re-announced him as a head coach of the team. He is currently the head coach of BC Gargždai-SC.

Career 

2005: BC Panevežys assistant coach
2005–2006: BC Panevežys assistant coach
2006–2007: BC Panevežys assistant coach
2007–2009: BC Neptūnas assistant coach
2009–2010: BC Neptūnas head coach
2010–2011: BC Neptūnas assistant coach
2011–2012: BC Neptūnas head coach
2011: Lithuanian U17 head coach
2012-2015: BC Budivelnyk Kyiv assistant coach
2015-2016: Ohud Medina head coach
2016-2017: BC Nevėžis head coach
2021-present: BC Gargždai-SC

References 

Lithuanian basketball coaches
Living people
1978 births
Sportspeople from Klaipėda
BC Neptūnas coaches
BC Lietkabelis coaches